The men's water polo tournament at the 2015 European Games was held in Baku, Azerbaijan from 13 to 21 June 2015.

Qualification

Preliminary round
All times are local (UTC+5).

Group A

Group B

Group C

Group D

Final round

Bracket
Championship bracket

5th place bracket

9th place bracket

13th place bracket

Playoffs

Quarterfinals

13–16th place semifinals

9–12th place semifinals

5–8th place semifinals

Semifinals

15th place game

13th place game

Eleventh place game

Ninth place game

Seventh place game

Fifth place game

Bronze medal game

Final

Final standings

See also
Water polo at the 2015 European Games – Women's tournament

References

Men